Jerry Coons Jr. (born April 21, 1972) is an American racecar driver. He currently competes in the United States Auto Club sprint car, midget, and Silver Crown divisions. He is one of only six drivers to win the USAC Triple Crown, with championships in the USAC Sprint Car, Midget, and Silver Crown divisions. At the close of the 2017 season, Coons has 19 USAC Midget wins, 17 USAC Sprint Car wins, and 7 USAC Silver Crown wins.

Racing career

Short Track Racing

Coons began his racing career at the age of five, driving quarter midgets with his father Jerry, Sr.

In the late 1980s, Coons began racing midget cars at the age of 14 in and around Arizona racetracks such as Manzanita Speedway, Raven Raceway, and El Paso Speedway Park. In 1987, he finished second in Arizona USAC Midget points, with one win at the Pima County Fairgrounds track and four second-place finishes.

In 1992, Coons was named track champion at El Paso Speedway Park, with 475 points from nine races.

At the Belleville Midget Nationals in 1996, Coons caught attention by winning the Friday night preliminary feature over Billy Boat, driving for car owner Rusty Kunz. He repeated as Friday night prelim winner at the same event in 1998 in the CED Motorsports car.

In 1998, Coons moved from Arizona to Indianapolis and teamed up with CED Motorsports to begin racing more regularly. Later that year, he appeared in his first USAC Silver Crown races, including the Sumar Classic at the Terre Haute Action Track and Eldora Speedway's Four Crown Nationals.

Coons' first USAC Sprint Car win came in the CED Motorsports #7c in 1999 in the Friday preliminary night for the Terre Haute National Open at the Terre Haute Action Track. He ran part-time in the series until 2005 when he joined Hoffman Dynamics in the #69 car and finished 7th in the standings with a win at Manzanita Speedway.

In 2008, Coons won both the USAC Silver Crown and Sprint Car championships.

In 2010, he was named National Midget Driver of the Decade, starting 282 features and claiming 56 wins over the course of the decade including. Also during that decade, he won the USAC Midget championship in 2006 and 2007, and was named National Midget Driver of the Year (NMDOTY) in 2007. He reclaimed the NMDOTY title in 2012 with four feature wins including the $12,000-to-win Belleville Midget Nationals.

Coons has wins in all three USAC series classes at Eldora Speedway's Four Crown Nationals, winning in Silver Crown in 2007 and 2014, Sprint Cars in 2009, and Midgets in 2010. He is a two-time Hoosier Hundred winner at the Indiana State Fairgrounds Speedway in 2011 and 2012, as well as a two-time Hulman Classic winner at the Terre Haute Action Track in 2010 and 2013.

Chili Bowl

Between 1994 and 2018, Coons has seventeen main event starts in the Chili Bowl Nationals, with a best finish of 4th in 2009, 2010, and 2016.

Indy Lights
In 2005, Coons competed in one IRL Infiniti Pro Series race at Nashville Superspeedway, driving for Hemelgarn Racing, where he started 10th and finished 9th.

Awards and accomplishments
USAC Triple Crown Champion
National Midget Driver of the Decade, 2010
National Sprint Car Poll Driver of the Year, 2008
Belleville Midget Nationals winner, 2005, 2007, 2012

Images

Motorsports career results
(key)

Chili Bowl Results

Little 500 Results

References

External links

Jerry Coons, Jr. USAC Record, 2007

1972 births
Indy Lights drivers
Living people
Racing drivers from Arizona
Racing drivers from Tucson, Arizona
Sportspeople from Tucson, Arizona
USAC Silver Crown Series drivers